Pomponatius is a genus of leaf-footed bugs, in the tribe Acanthocorini, erected by William Lucas Distant in 1904.

References

External links
 

Coreidae genera
Coreinae